Christer Reppesgård Hansen (born 29 March 1993) is a Norwegian football defender.

He started his career in Hedrum IL, and joined the regional great team Sandefjord as a junior in 2010. After playing one first-team game in 2011, he was drafted into the senior squad in 2012.

Career statistics

Club

References

1993 births
Living people
People from Larvik
Norwegian footballers
Sandefjord Fotball players
Sandnes Ulf players
Norwegian First Division players
Eliteserien players
Association football defenders
Sportspeople from Vestfold og Telemark